Hampshire County Schools is the operating school district within Hampshire County, West Virginia. It is governed by the Hampshire County Board of Education.

Schools

High schools
Serves grades 9-12 
Hampshire High School , Romney

Middle schools
Serves grades 6-8
Capon Bridge Middle School , Capon Bridge
Romney Middle School , Romney

Elementary schools
Serves grades K-5
Augusta Elementary School , Augusta
Capon Bridge Elementary School , Capon Bridge
John J. Cornwell Elementary School, Levels
Romney Elementary School , Romney
Slanesville Elementary School , Slanesville
Springfield-Green Spring Elementary School, Springfield

Career training centers
Hampshire County Career Training Center, Romney

Schools no longer in operation
Capon Bridge High School, Capon Bridge
Capon Bridge Junior High School, Capon Bridge
Grassy Lick Elementary School, Kirby
Green Spring Elementary School, Green Spring
Hoy Grade School, Hoy
Levels Elementary School, Levels
Mill Creek Elementary School, Purgitsville
Rio Elementary School, Rio
Romney Colored School, Romney
Romney High School, Romney
Romney Junior High School, Romney
Springfield Elementary School, Springfield

External links
Hampshire County Schools Board of Education

School districts in West Virginia